David Adam Galef (born March 27, 1959) is an American fiction writer, critic, poet, translator, and essayist.

Born in the Bronx, he grew up in Scarsdale. He graduated summa cum laude from Princeton University in 1981, after which he lived in Osaka, Japan, for a year. He received an M.A. in English from Columbia University in 1984, and a Ph.D. in literature in 1989. In 1992, he married Beth Weinhouse. From 1989 to 2008, he was a professor of English at the University of Mississippi in Oxford, where he administered the M.F.A. program in creative writing until 2007. David Galef and his family currently live in Montclair, where he is an English professor and director of the creative writing program at Montclair State University.

Galef has published over sixteen books. In addition, he has written over two hundred short stories for magazines ranging from the British Punch to the Czech Prague Revue, the Canadian Prism International and the American Shenandoah.  His essays and reviews have appeared in The New York Times, Newsday, The Village Voice, Twentieth Century Literature, The Columbia History of the British Novel and many other places. His awards include a Henfield Foundation grant, a Writers Exchange award from Poets & Writers,  the Meringoff Prize for fiction, and a Mississippi Arts Council grant, as well as residencies at Yaddo, Ragdale, and Virginia Center for the Creative Arts.

Works
Novels
Flesh. New York:  The Permanent Press, 1995. Russian translation, 2008.
Turning Japanese. New York:  The Permanent Press, 1998.
How to Cope with Suburban Stress New York:  The Permanent Press, 2006. Russian translation rights and film option sold, 2007.
Short-Story Collections
Laugh Track. Jackson, MS: The University Press of Mississippi, 2002.
A Man of Ideas and Other Stories. Las Cruces, NM: Noemi Press, 2008.
My Date with Neanderthal Woman. Ann Arbor, MI: Dzanc Books, 2011.
Poetry Collections
Flaws. Cincinnati, OH: David Roberts Books, 2007.
Lists. Indian Trail, NC: D-N Publishing, 2007.
Apocalypses. Georgetown, KY: Finishing Line Press, 2009.
Kanji Poems. Cincinnati, OH: Word Poetry, 2015.
Children’s Books
The Little Red Bicycle. Illus. Carol Nicklaus. New York: Random House, 1988.
Tracks. Illus. Tedd Arnold. New York: William Morrow, 1996. Rpt.by Junior Library Guild, 1996, and Scholastic (paperback and audio tape), 1996.
Translations
Even Monkeys Fall from Trees: The Wit and Wisdom of Japanese Proverbs. Illus. Jun Hashimoto. Tokyo: Tuttle, 2000. Rpt. of Even Monkeys Fall from Trees, and Other Japanese Proverbs. 1987.
Even a Stone Buddha Can Talk: More Wit and Wisdom of Japanese Proverbs. Illus. Jun Hashimoto. Tokyo: Tuttle, 2000.
Japanese Proverbs: Wit and Wisdom. Illus. Jun Hashimoto. Tokyo: Tuttle, 2012.
Criticism
Second Thoughts: A Focus on Rereading.  Detroit: Wayne State University Press, 1998.  [Editor and contributor.]
The Supporting Cast: A Study of Flat and Minor Characters. University Park, PA: The Pennsylvania State University Press, 1993.
Anthology
20 over 40. Jackson, MS: The University Press of Mississippi, 2006. [Co-editor with Beth Weinhouse.]
Textbook
Brevity: A Flash Fiction Handbook. New York: Columbia University Press, 2016.
Edition
Tess of the d’Urbervilles, by Thomas Hardy. New York: Barnes & Noble, 2005. [Editor.]

See also

Tedd Arnold

References

External references
Contemporary Authors. Vol. 145. Ed. Kathleen J. Edgar. Gale Research, 1995. 151.
World Authors 1990-1995, ed. Clifford Thompson (New York: H. W. Wilson, 1999). 241-43.
Mississippi Writers Page, https://web.archive.org/web/20080204205546/http://www.olemiss.edu/mwp/dir/galef_david/index.html
Interview with David Galef

1959 births
Princeton University alumni
Columbia Graduate School of Arts and Sciences alumni
University of Mississippi faculty
20th-century American novelists
21st-century American novelists
American literary critics
American male novelists
Living people
People from Scarsdale, New York
Montclair State University faculty
American male short story writers
20th-century American poets
21st-century American poets
American male poets
20th-century American translators
21st-century American translators
American male essayists
20th-century American short story writers
21st-century American short story writers
20th-century American essayists
21st-century American essayists
20th-century American male writers
21st-century American male writers
Novelists from New Jersey
Novelists from Mississippi